Barbara Ker Wilson  (24 September 1929 – 10 September 2020) was an English-born Australian novelist. She is credited as the person who "discovered" Paddington Bear. She wrote over twenty books and collated collections of stories. She gained awards for helping other writers.

Life
Wilson was born in Sunderland in 1929. Her parents were Margaret (born Rogers) and William Ker Wilson. Her father was an aeronautical engineer who wrote on that subject. After she attended the North London Collegiate School in 1938, she entered publishing in 1949 at Oxford University Press where she became an assistant editor. She went on to work for Bodley Head and in 1957 she moved to Collins where she discovered a draft by Michael Bond. He had created a book for children featuring the talking bear from Peru named Paddington Bear. After reading the draft at one sitting she phoned the author at the number given. She was put through to Lime Green Studios and Michael Bond who told her that as a TV cameraman he was not supposed to take calls at work.

In 1954, she created the anthology Scottish Folk-Tales and Legends. The first of the twenty novels she wrote was Path-Through-the-Woods which was published in 1958. and thereafter she wrote almost 20 novels for children, including the highly acclaimed Last Year’s Broken Toys (1962), which gave a child’s-eye view of growing up during the second world war. She also wrote two novels for adults, Jane Austen in Australia (1984) and The Quade Inheritance (1988).

In 1956, she married Peter Tahourdin, a composer. She and her husband moved to Adelaide in 1964 after the 1963 winter to find a better climate. Her husband obtained a job as a composer in Residence at the University of Adelaide. The couple had divorced by 1978. She later moved to Sydney where she returned to publishing working for Angus & Robertson. Her career in publishing continued at Hodder and Stoughton, Reader's Digest (managing editor of condensed books) and, finally, at University of Queensland Press.

In 2008, she published "The Lost Years of Jane Austen" which describes a time in Austen's life which is not documented as her letters were destroyed. Wilson recreates Austen's story imagining a visit to an Australian prison colony and romance.

Ker Wilson died in Bowral, New South Wales on 10 September 2020, survived by her daughters and two grandchildren.

Awards and honors
For her work in children's literature, she received the Pixie O'Harris Award in 1997. In 1999, she won the Dromkeen Medal given to the person who has greatly assisted children's literature in Australia. Five years later she was made a Member of the Order of Australia noting the support she had given to emerging writers.

References

1929 births
2020 deaths
English women novelists
Australian women novelists
People from Sunderland
Writers from Sydney
Members of the Order of Australia
English emigrants to Australia
People educated at North London Collegiate School
Writers from Tyne and Wear
20th-century English novelists
20th-century English women writers
20th-century Australian novelists
20th-century Australian women writers
21st-century Australian novelists
21st-century Australian women writers
English book editors
Australian book editors
Australian women editors
British women editors
21st-century English women
21st-century English people